Daud Ali (born 1964) is an American historian of Indian descent.

Early life
Daud Ali was born in Calcutta, India, to a Bengali father and an American mother. He moved to Baltimore, United States when he was two years old. His Bengali father and his own interest in Indian philosophy led him to study South Asian history in college. He went on to study Sanskrit, Tamil and Indian philosophy. He obtained a Bachelor of Arts degree in English literature and religious studies at the College of William & Mary and then obtained a Master of Arts degree in the history of religions at the University of Chicago Divinity School where he was a student of Ron Inden. His thesis on medieval South Indian history led him to a Ph.D. from the University of Chicago, after which he taught history of ancient India for 14 years at the School of Oriental and African Studies in London. Since 2009, he has been an Associate Professor in the Department of South Asia Studies at the University of Pennsylvania.

Publications

Tours
He led an annual tour to southern India for Far Horizons Archaeological and Cultural Trips.

References

1964 births
Living people
20th-century Bengalis
Writers from Kolkata
College of William & Mary alumni
University of Chicago Divinity School alumni
University of Pennsylvania faculty
Academics of SOAS University of London
Indian emigrants to the United States
American male writers of Indian descent
21st-century American historians
21st-century American male writers
American male non-fiction writers